Prionapteryx eberti is a moth in the family Crambidae. It was described by Graziano Bassi and Wolfram Mey in 2013. It is found in Namibia.

References

Ancylolomiini
Moths described in 2013